Wettinia hirsuta is a species of flowering plant in the family Arecaceae. It is found only in Colombia. It is threatened by habitat loss.

References

hirsuta
Endemic flora of Colombia
Endangered flora of South America
Taxonomy articles created by Polbot
Taxa named by Max Burret